The Svidník gas field is a natural gas field located in Svidník, Prešov Region. It was discovered in 2008 and developed by Aurelian Oil & Gas and Romgaz. It will begin production in 2015 and will produce natural gas and condensates. The total proven reserves of the Svidník gas field are around 408 billion cubic feet (11.5×109m³), and production is slated to be around 100 million cubic feet/day (2.8×105m³) in 2015.

References

Natural gas fields in Slovakia